Whitelaw may refer to:

Places
 Whitelaw, Wisconsin, a village
 Whitelaw, Alberta, a hamlet in Canada

Other
 Whitelaw (surname)
 Whitelaw Hotel, an historic building in Washington, DC